The Benders were a Sydney jazz band.

Benders may also refer to:
 Bloody Benders, 1870s family of Kansas serial killers
 Benders (TV series), a 2015 American television series
 Benders decomposition in mathematical programming

People with the surname Benders:
 Jacques F. Benders (1924–2017), Dutch mathematician
 Johan Benders (1907–1943), Dutch teacher
 M. H. Benders (born 1971), Dutch poet

See also 
 Bend (disambiguation)
 Bender (disambiguation)